Coffy is a soundtrack produced, composed, and arranged by Roy Ayers for the blaxploitation film Coffy. It was released in 1973 on Polydor Records and peaked at number 31 on the jazz albums chart.

Track listing
All songs written by Roy Ayers, except by "End of Sugarman" Ayers and Harry Whitaker. Lyrics to "Coffy Is the Color", "King George" and "Shining Symbol" written by Carl Clay; lyrics to "Coffy Baby" written by Roselle Weaver.

Personnel
Music score composed, arranged and conducted by Roy Ayers; orchestrations by Harry Whitaker.

Harry Whitaker - Electric piano, organ, harpsichord, piano
Billy Nichols, Bob Rose - Guitar
Richard Davis - Acoustic and electric bass
Dennis Davis - Drums
William King - Bongos, congas, percussion
Cecil Bridgewater - Trumpet, flugelhorn
Jon Faddis - Trumpet, flugelhorn
Wayne Andre, Garnett Brown - Trombone
Peter Dimitriades, Harry Lookofsky, Irving Spice, Emanuel Vardi - Strings
Denise "Dee Dee" Bridgewater - Vocals on "Coffy Is the Color" and "Coffy Baby"
Wayne Garfield- Vocals on "Coffy Is the Color" and "Shining Symbol"
Roy Ayers - Vibraphone, vocals on "Coffy Is the Color" and "King George"

Charts

References

Roy Ayers albums
Crime film soundtracks
Jazz-funk albums
1973 soundtrack albums
Polydor Records soundtracks